77 Bombay Street is a Swiss folk rock musical group that was formed in 2008 in Scharans, canton Graubünden. It consists of four brothers Matt, Joe, Simri-Ramon and Esra Buchli. The band was named after their temporary home in Adelaide, Australia, where the whole Buchli family lived for two years. As of 2021, the band had released five studio albums, the first called Dead Bird self-released, the other three Up in the Sky, Oko Town and Seven Mountains in association with Gadget Records. In 2021 they released their fifth album, Start Over.

Both Up in the Sky (2011) and Oko Town (2012) went platinum in Switzerland, the former peaking at the third place, the latter hitting the top of Schweizer Hitparade, the official Swiss Albums Chart. According to their official Facebook site, the band is currently working on their fourth studio album. In an interview Matt Buchli said "Yes, we are busy writing new songs and we’ve got a feeling it will be fantastic! Every album is a new and great challenge." 

In 2012 the band won two Swiss Music Awards with album Up in the Sky and its title track "Up in the Sky" for Best Album Pop/Rock National and Best Hit National, respectively. In 2015, the band worked on their fourth studio album, Seven Mountains, which has been released in fall 2015. In summer 2021 the album Start Over has been published.

Band members 
 Matt Buchli – lead vocals, background vocals, acoustic guitar
 Simri-Ramon Buchli – vocals, background vocals, bass guitar
 Joe Buchli– vocals, background vocals, electric guitar
 Esra Buchli – vocals, drums

Discography

Albums

Singles

References

External links 
 

2008 establishments in Switzerland
Musical groups established in 2008
Sibling quartets
Swiss alternative rock groups
Swiss folk music groups
Swiss indie rock groups